Gemmula lululimi is a species of sea snail, a marine gastropod mollusk in the family Turridae, the turrids.

Description
The length of the shell varies between 75 mm and 90.5 mm. The shell is characterised by its white body with continuous brown ridges, with a rather short siphonal canal and a strongly crenulated sinus cord.

Distribution
This marine species occurs off the Philippines; also off Papua New Guinea and southwest Japan.

References

 Vera-Pelaez J.L., Vega-Luz R. & Lozano-Francisco M.C. (2000) Five new species of the genus Turris Roding, 1798 (Gastropoda; Turridae; Turrinae) of the Philippines and one new species of the Southern Indo-Pacific. Malakos [Revista de la Asociacion Malacologica Andaluza], Monografia 2: 1-29.

External links
 Kilburn, Richard N., Alexander E. Fedosov, and Baldomero M. Olivera. "Revision of the genus Turris (Gastropoda: Conoidea: Turridae) with the description of six new species." Zootaxa 3244.1 (2012): 1
 Gastropods.com: Gemmula (Gemmula - speciosa group) lululimi
  Tucker, J.K. 2004 Catalog of recent and fossil turrids (Mollusca: Gastropoda). Zootaxa 682:1-1295.

lululimi
Gastropods described in 1999